Geothermal energy is the thermal energy in the Earth's crust which originates from the formation of the planet and from radioactive decay of materials. The high temperature and pressure in Earth's interior cause some rock to melt and solid mantle to behave plastically. This results in parts of the mantle convecting upward since it is lighter than the surrounding rock. Temperatures at the core–mantle boundary can reach over 4000 °C (7200 °F).

Geothermal heating, using water from hot springs, for example, has been used for bathing since Paleolithic times and for space heating since ancient Roman times. More recently geothermal power, the term used for generation of electricity from geothermal energy, has gained in importance. It is estimated that the earth's geothermal resources are theoretically more than adequate to supply humanity's energy needs, although only a very small fraction is currently being profitably exploited, often in areas near tectonic plate boundaries.

As a result of government assisted research and industry experience, the cost of generating geothermal power decreased by 25% over the 1980s and 1990s. More recent technological advances have dramatically reduced costs and thereby expanded the range and size of viable resources. In 2021, the U.S. Department of Energy estimates that geothermal energy from a power plant "built today" costs about $0.05/kWh.

In 2019, 13,900 megawatts (MW) of geothermal power was available worldwide. An additional 28 gigawatts of direct geothermal heating capacity has been installed for district heating, space heating, spas, industrial processes, desalination and agricultural applications as of 2010. 

Forecasts for the future of geothermal power depend on assumptions about technology, energy prices, subsidies, plate boundary movement and interest rates. Pilot programs like EWEB's customer opt in Green Power Program show that customers would be willing to pay a little more for a renewable energy source like geothermal. About 100 thousand people are employed in the industry.

History

Hot springs have been used for bathing at least since Paleolithic times. The oldest known spa is a  site where the Huaqing Chi palace was later built. In the first century CE, Romans conquered Aquae Sulis, now Bath, Somerset, England, and used the hot springs there to feed public baths and underfloor heating. The admission fees for these baths probably represent the first commercial use of geothermal power. The world's oldest geothermal district heating system in Chaudes-Aigues, France, has been operating since the 15th century. 
The earliest industrial exploitation began in 1827 with the use of geyser steam to extract boric acid from volcanic mud in Larderello, Italy.

In 1892, America's first district heating system in Boise, Idaho was powered directly by geothermal energy, and was copied in Klamath Falls, Oregon in 1900. The first known building in the world to utilize geothermal energy as its primary heat source was the Hot Lake Hotel in Union County, Oregon, whose construction was completed in 1907. A deep geothermal well was used to heat greenhouses in Boise in 1926, and geysers were used to heat greenhouses in Iceland and Tuscany at about the same time. Charlie Lieb developed the first downhole heat exchanger in 1930 to heat his house. Steam and hot water from geysers began heating homes in Iceland starting in 1943.

In the 20th century, demand for electricity led to the consideration of geothermal power as a generating source. Prince Piero Ginori Conti tested the first geothermal power generator on 4 July 1904, at the same Larderello dry steam field where geothermal acid extraction began. It successfully lit four light bulbs. Later, in 1911, the world's first commercial geothermal power plant was built there. It was the world's only industrial producer of geothermal electricity until New Zealand built a plant in 1958. In 2012, it produced some 594 megawatts.

In 1960, Pacific Gas and Electric began operation of the first successful geothermal electric power plant in the United States at The Geysers in California. The original turbine lasted for more than 30 years and produced 11 MW net power.

The binary cycle power plant was first demonstrated in 1967 in the USSR and later introduced to the US in 1981. This technology allows the generation of electricity from much lower temperature resources than previously.

In 2021 Quaise Energy announced the idea of using a gyrotron as a boring machine to drill a hole 20 kilometers in depth and use it to produce geothermal energy. The technique would use frequencies of 30 to 300 GHz and would transfer energy to a rock 1012 (1 trillion) times more efficiently than using a laser. Lasers would further be disrupted by the vaporized rock, which would effect the longer-wavelength much less. Drilling rates of 70 meters/hour appear to be possible with a 1 MW gyrotron.

Resources

The Earth's internal thermal energy flows to the surface by conduction at a rate of 44.2 terawatts (TW), and is replenished by radioactive decay of minerals at a rate of 30 TW. These power rates are more than double humanity's current energy consumption from all primary sources, but most of this energy flow is not recoverable.

Outside of the seasonal variations, the geothermal gradient of temperatures through the crust is 25–30 °C (45–54 °F) per km of depth in most of the world. The conductive heat flux averages 0.1 MW/km2. These values are much higher near tectonic plate boundaries where the crust is thinner. They may be further augmented by fluid circulation, either through magma conduits, hot springs, hydrothermal circulation or a combination of these.

The thermal efficiency and profitability of electricity generation is particularly sensitive to temperature. The most demanding applications receive the greatest benefit from a high natural heat flux, ideally from using a hot spring. The next best option is to drill a well into a hot aquifer. If no adequate aquifer is available, an artificial one may be built by injecting water to hydraulically fracture the bedrock. This last approach is called hot dry rock geothermal energy in Europe, or enhanced geothermal systems in North America. Much greater potential may be available from this approach than from conventional tapping of natural aquifers.

Estimates of the potential for electricity generation from geothermal energy vary sixfold, from  depending on the scale of investments. Wells of this depth are now common in the petroleum industry.

Geothermal power

Geothermal power is electrical power generated from geothermal energy. Technologies in use include dry steam power stations, flash steam power stations and binary cycle power stations. Geothermal electricity generation is currently used in 26 countries, while geothermal heating is in use in 70 countries.

As of 2019, worldwide geothermal power capacity amounts to 15.4 gigawatts (GW), of which 23.86 percent or 3.68 GW are installed in the United States. International markets grew at an average annual rate of 5 percent over the three years to 2015, and global geothermal power capacity is expected to reach 14.5–17.6 GW by 2020. Based on current geologic knowledge and technology the GEA publicly discloses, the Geothermal Energy Association (GEA) estimates that only 6.9 percent of total global potential has been tapped so far, while the IPCC reported geothermal power potential to be in the range of 35 GW to 2 TW. Geothermal energy is a key renewable source that covers a significant share of the electricity demand in countries like Iceland, El Salvador, Kenya, the Philippines and New Zealand,  and more than 90 % of the heating demand in Iceland.

Geothermal power is considered to be a sustainable, renewable source of energy because the heat extraction is small compared with the Earth's heat content. The greenhouse gas emissions of geothermal electric stations are on average 45 grams of carbon dioxide per kilowatt-hour of electricity, or less than 5 percent of that of conventional coal-fired plants.

As a source of renewable energy for both power and heating, geothermal has the potential to meet 3-5% of global demand by 2050. With economic incentives, it is estimated that by 2100 it will be possible to meet 10% of global demand.

Geothermal electric plants were traditionally built exclusively on the edges of tectonic plates where high-temperature geothermal resources are available near the surface. The development of binary cycle power plants and improvements in drilling and extraction technology enable enhanced geothermal systems over a much greater geographical range. Demonstration projects are operational in Landau-Pfalz, Germany, and Soultz-sous-Forêts, France, while an earlier effort in Basel, Switzerland, was shut down after it triggered earthquakes. Other demonstration projects are under construction in Australia, the United Kingdom, and the United States of America. In Myanmar over 39 locations capable of geothermal power production and some of these hydrothermal reservoirs lie quite close to Yangon which is a significant underutilized resource.

Geothermal heating

Geothermal heating is the direct use of geothermal energy for some heating applications. Humans have taken advantage of geothermal heat this way since the Paleolithic era. Approximately seventy countries made direct use of a total of 270 PJ of geothermal heating in 2004. As of 2007, 28 GW of geothermal heating capacity is installed around the world, satisfying 0.07% of global primary energy consumption. Thermal efficiency is high since no energy conversion is needed, but capacity factors tend to be low (around 20%) since the heat is mostly needed in the winter.

Geothermal energy originates from the heat retained within the Earth since the original formation of the planet, from radioactive decay of minerals, and from solar energy absorbed at the surface. Most high temperature geothermal heat is harvested in regions close to tectonic plate boundaries where volcanic activity rises close to the surface of the Earth. In these areas, ground and groundwater can be found with temperatures higher than the target temperature of the application. However, even cold ground contains heat, below  the undisturbed ground temperature is consistently at the Mean Annual Air Temperature and it may be extracted with a ground source heat pump.

Types
Geothermal energy comes in either vapor-dominated or liquid-dominated forms. Larderello and The Geysers are vapor-dominated. Vapor-dominated sites offer temperatures from 240 to 300 °C that produce superheated steam.

Liquid-dominated plants
Flash plants are the common way to generate electricity from these sources. Pumps are generally not required, powered instead when the water turns to steam. Most wells generate 2–10 MW of electricity. Steam is separated from a liquid via cyclone separators, while the liquid is returned to the reservoir for reheating/reuse. As of 2013, the largest liquid system is Cerro Prieto in Mexico, which generates 750 MW of electricity from temperatures reaching . The Salton Sea field in Southern California offers the potential of generating 2000 MW of electricity.

Lower-temperature LDRs (120–200 °C) require pumping. They are common in extensional terrains, where heating takes place via deep circulation along faults, such as in the Western US and Turkey. Water passes through a heat exchanger in a Rankine cycle binary plant. The water vaporizes an organic working fluid that drives a turbine. These binary plants originated in the Soviet Union in the late 1960s and predominate in new US plants. Binary plants have no emissions.

Enhanced geothermal systems

Enhanced geothermal systems (EGS) actively inject water into wells to be heated and pumped back out. The water is injected under high pressure to expand existing rock fissures to enable the water to freely flow in and out. The technique was adapted from oil and gas extraction techniques. However, the geologic formations are deeper and no toxic chemicals are used, reducing the possibility of environmental damage. Drillers can employ directional drilling to expand the size of the reservoir.

Small-scale EGS have been installed in the Rhine Graben at Soultz-sous-Forêts in France and at Landau and Insheim in Germany.

Economics

Geothermal power requires no fuel (except for pumps), and is therefore immune to fuel cost fluctuations. However, capital costs are significant. Drilling accounts for over half the costs, and exploration of deep resources entails significant risks. A typical well doublet (extraction and injection wells) in Nevada can support 4.5 megawatts (MW) and costs about $10 million to drill, with a 20% failure rate.

As noted above, drilling cost is a major component of a geothermal power plant's budget and is one of the key barriers to wider development of geothermal resources.  A power plant must have production wells to bring the hot fluid (steam or hot water) to the surface and must also have injection wells to pump the liquid back into the reservoir after it has passed through the power plant. Drilling geothermal wells is more expensive than drilling oil and gas wells of comparable depth for several reasons: 
 Geothermal reservoirs are usually in igneous or metamorphic rock, which is harder than the sedimentary rock of hydrocarbon reservoirs.
 The rock is often fractured, which causes vibrations that are damaging to bits and other drilling tools.
 The rock is often abrasive, with high quartz content, and sometimes contains highly corrosive fluids.
 The formation is, by definition, hot, which limits use of downhole electronics.
 Casing in geothermal wells must be cemented from top to bottom, to resist the casing's tendency to expand and contract with temperature changes.  Oil and gas wells are usually cemented only at the bottom.
 Because the geothermal well produces a low-value fluid (steam or hot water) its diameter is considerably larger than typical oil and gas wells.

In total, electrical plant construction and well drilling cost about €2–5 million per MW of electrical capacity, while the break-even price is 0.04–0.10 € per kW·h. Enhanced geothermal systems tend to be on the high side of these ranges, with capital costs above $4 million per MW and break-even above $0.054 per kW·h in 2007. The capital cost of one such district heating system in Bavaria was estimated at somewhat over 1 million € per MW. Direct systems of any size are much simpler than electric generators and have lower maintenance costs per kW·h, but they must consume electricity to run pumps and compressors. Some governments subsidize geothermal projects.

Geothermal power is highly scalable: from a rural village to an entire city, making it a vital part of the renewable energy transition.

The most developed geothermal field in the United States is The Geysers in Northern California.

Geothermal projects have several stages of development. Each phase has associated risks. At the early stages of reconnaissance and geophysical surveys, many projects are canceled, making that phase unsuitable for traditional lending. Projects moving forward from the identification, exploration and exploratory drilling often trade equity for financing.

Renewability and sustainability
Geothermal power is considered to be renewable because any projected heat extraction is small compared to the Earth's heat content. The Earth has an internal heat content of 1031 joules (3·1015 TWh), approximately 100 billion times the 2010 worldwide annual energy consumption. About 20% of this is residual heat from planetary accretion; the remainder is attributed to past and current radioactive decay of naturally occurring isotopes. For example, a 5275 m deep borehole in United Downs Deep Geothermal Power Project in Cornwall, England, found granite with very high thorium content, whose radioactive decay is believed to power the high temperature of the rock.

Natural heat flows are not in equilibrium, and the planet is slowly cooling down on geologic timescales. Human extraction taps a minute fraction of the natural outflow, often without accelerating it. According to most official descriptions of geothermal energy use, it is currently called renewable and sustainable because it returns an equal volume of water to the area that the heat extraction takes place, but at a somewhat lower temperature. For instance, the water leaving the ground is 300 degrees, and the water returning is 200 degrees, the energy obtained is the difference in heat that is extracted. Current research estimates of impact on the heat loss from the Earth's core are based on a studies done up through 2012. However, if household and industrial uses of this energy source were to expand dramatically over coming years, based on a diminishing fossil fuel supply and a growing world population that is rapidly industrializing requiring additional energy sources, then the estimates on the impact on the Earth's cooling rate would need to be re-evaluated.

Geothermal power is also considered to be sustainable thanks to its power to sustain the Earth's intricate ecosystems. By using geothermal sources of energy present generations of humans will not endanger the capability of future generations to use their own resources to the same amount that those energy sources are presently used. Further, due to its low emissions geothermal energy is considered to have excellent potential for mitigation of global warming. Iceland has so much geothermal energy that even the sidewalks in Reykjavik are heated with it. In winter, this saves the need for gritting.

Even though geothermal power is globally sustainable, extraction must still be monitored to avoid local depletion. Over the course of decades, individual wells draw down local temperatures and water levels until a new equilibrium is reached with natural flows. The three oldest sites, at Larderello, Wairakei, and the Geysers have experienced reduced output because of local depletion. Heat and water, in uncertain proportions, were extracted faster than they were replenished. If production is reduced and water is reinjected, these wells could theoretically recover their full potential. Such mitigation strategies have already been implemented at some sites. The long-term sustainability of geothermal energy has been demonstrated at the Lardarello field in Italy since 1913, at the Wairakei field in New Zealand since 1958, and at The Geysers field in California since 1960.

Falling electricity production may be boosted through drilling additional supply boreholes, as at Poihipi and Ohaaki. The Wairakei power station has been running much longer, with its first unit commissioned in November 1958, and it attained its peak generation of 173 MW in 1965, but already the supply of high-pressure steam was faltering, in 1982 being derated to intermediate pressure and the station managing 157 MW. Around the start of the 21st century it was managing about 150 MW, then in 2005 two 8 MW isopentane systems were added, boosting the station's output by about 14 MW. Detailed data are unavailable, being lost due to re-organisations. One such re-organisation in 1996 causes the absence of early data for Poihipi (started 1996), and the gap in 1996/7 for Wairakei and Ohaaki; half-hourly data for Ohaaki's first few months of operation are also missing, as well as for most of Wairakei's history.

Environmental effects

Fluids drawn from the deep Earth carry a mixture of gasses, notably carbon dioxide, hydrogen sulfide, methane and ammonia. These pollutants contribute to global warming, acid rain, and noxious smells if released. But a few plants emit more than gas-fired power, at least in the first few years, such as some geothermal power in Turkey. Plants that experience high levels of acids and volatile chemicals are usually equipped with emission-control systems to reduce the exhaust.

In addition to dissolved gases, hot water from geothermal sources may hold in solution trace amounts of toxic elements such as mercury, arsenic, boron, and antimony.  These chemicals precipitate as the water cools, and can cause environmental damage if released. The modern practice of injecting cooled geothermal fluids back into the Earth to stimulate production has the side benefit of reducing this environmental risk.

Plant construction can adversely affect land stability. Subsidence has occurred in the Wairakei field in New Zealand. In Staufen im Breisgau, Germany, tectonic uplift occurred instead, due to a previously isolated anhydrite layer coming in contact with water and turning into gypsum, doubling its volume. Enhanced geothermal systems can trigger earthquakes as part of hydraulic fracturing. The project in Basel, Switzerland was suspended because more than 10,000 seismic events measuring up to 3.4 on the Richter Scale occurred over the first 6 days of water injection.

Geothermal has minimal land and freshwater requirements.

Production

Philippines

The Philippines began efforts in researching geothermal energy in 1962 when the Philippine Institute of Volcanology and Seismology inspected the geothermal region in Tiwi, Albay. The desire in shifting to geothermal energy was due to the worldwide oil crisis in the 1970s. These efforts led to the construction of the first geothermal power plant in the Philippines in 1977 which is located in Tongonan, Leyte. The development of the geothermal plant in the Tongonan field was made possible due the drilling contract with the New Zealand government in 1972. The Tongonan Geothermal Field (TGF) advanced in growth by adding plants such as Upper Mahiao, Matlibog, and South Sambaloran which resulted in producing 508 MV in the area. By 2008, the TGF was recognized as one of the world's most developed geothermal power plants.

As research in geothermal energy progressed, the first geothermal power plant in the Tiwi region operated in 1979 and two other plants followed the area in 1980 and 1982. The Tiwi geothermal field is located about 450 km from Manila, which is on Luzon Island and the country's capital. The three geothermal power plants in the Tiwi region were producing 330 MWe which allowed the Philippines to be next behind the United States and Mexico in geothermal growth. The geological location of the Philippines resulted in volcanic activity, which is a source of geothermal energy, and it became an advantage since it provided resources to further the research. The Philippines has 7 geothermal fields and continues to contribute efforts in utilizing geothermal energy by creating the Philippine Energy Plan 2012-2030, aiming to achieve utilizing 70% of geothermal energy by 2030.

United States

According to the Geothermal Energy Association (GEA) installed geothermal capacity in the United States grew by 5%, or 147.05 MW, since the last annual survey in March 2012. This increase came from seven geothermal projects that began production in 2012. GEA also revised its 2011 estimate of installed capacity upward by 128 MW, bringing current installed U.S. geothermal capacity to 3,386 MW.

See also

2010 World Geothermal Congress
Earth's internal heat budget
Hydrothermal vent
International Geothermal Association
Relative cost of electricity generated by different sources
Renewable energy by country
Thermal battery

References

External links

 Hawaii Groundwater & Geothermal Resources Center, University of Hawaii at Manoa
 Geothermal Resources Council
 Energy Efficiency and Renewable Energy – Geothermal Technologies Office
 International Energy Agency Geothermal Energy Homepage
 NREL – Geothermal Research
 2022 discussion of geothermal energy advantages and challenges

 
Power station technology
Sustainable energy
Volcanism